The 6th Air Defense Missile Squadron was an air defense unit of the United States Air Force. It was assigned to the New York Air Defense Sector of Aerospace Defense Command, at Suffolk County Air Force Base, New York, where it was inactivated on 15 December 1964.  The squadron had its headquarters at Suffolk County Air Force Base, while the firing batteries of the squadron were at the nearby Suffolk County Air Force Base Missile Annex.

The squadron was consolidated in 1985 with two earlier units.  The first is the 6th Antisubmarine Squadron (previously the 5th Reconnaissance Squadron and 393d Bombardment Squadron).  This squadron participated in the antisubmarine campaign in the Atlantic from bases in the United States and Europe until disbanding in 1943, when the Navy assumed the land based antisubmarine mission from the Army Air Forces.

The other predecessor of the squadron is the 6th Combat Cargo Squadron, which participated in the Southwest Pacific Theater, earning a Philippine Republic Presidential Unit Citation.  After V-J Day, it formed part of the army of occupation in Japan, until inactivating in 1946.  It was disbanded while inactive in 1948.

These three units were consolidated into the renamed 6th Tactical Missile Squadron. The consolidated squadron has, up until early 2020, never been active.

History

World War II antisubmarine operations
What is now the 6th Tactical Missile Squadron was originally activated as the 3d Reconnaissance Squadron in early 1941, equipped with North American B-25 Mitchells as part of First Air Force.  After the United States entered World War II the squadron was ordered to search for German U-boats and to fly aerial coverage of friendly convoys initially off the southeast coast. It then moved to Mitchel Field, New York to patrol the sea approaches to New York City.  In April 1942, the squadron was redesignated as the 393d Bombardment Squadron (Medium).

Later in 1942, the squadron was redesignated as 6th Antisubmarine Squadron, and reassigned to 25th Antisubmarine Wing of Army Air Forces Antisubmarine Command (AAFAC).  After joining AAFAC, it moved to Westover Field, Massachusetts to patrol the sea approaches to Boston, then to Gander, Newfoundland to fly antisubmarine patrols over North Atlantic convoy routes.  The squadron was reassigned to 479th Antisubmarine Group in Southwest England in August 1943 and flew killer hunts against German U-boats in the Bay of Biscay off the western coast of France from Brest south to the Spanish border.   Along this part of the occupied French coast were major Kriegsmarine U-boat bases at Brest, Lorient, Saint-Nazaire, La Rochelle (La Pallice) and Bordeaux.  Its ground echelon was ordered in September, just prior to inactivation of AAFAC, to move to Salt Lake City Army Air Base, Utah, where it was inactivated on 30 October 1943, while the air echelon was disbanded in England in late November 1943 with squadron aircraft reassigned to the United States Navy.  Squadron personnel remaining in England were reassigned to Eighth Air Force units as replacement personnel.

World War II Pacific Theater and occupation of Japan
The second birth of the squadron was in 1944, when it was activated as the 6th Combat Cargo Squadron at Syracuse Army Air Base, New York as part of the 2d Combat Cargo Group.  After training in New York and moving briefly to Baer Field, Indiana for overseas processing, the squadron moved to the Pacific.  Operating from Biak Island, it flew passengers and cargo to American bases in Australia, New Guinea, the Admiralty Islands, and the Philippines.  The squadron also dropped supplies to American and Philippine resistance forces.  It transported personnel and supplies to the Ryukus and evacuated casualties on the return flights until moving to Okinawa.  It then transported personnel and equipment to Japan and ferried liberated prisoners of war to the Philippines.  It moved to Japan, where it served as part of the Occupation Forces, until it was inactivated in 1946.  The squadron was disbanded in 1948.

Cold War air defense
The third activation of the squadron was as the 6th Air Defense Missile Squadron on 1 February 1959.

In 1955, plans were made that the Suffolk County Air Force Base Missile Annex should be ready in February 1960. It was activated as the second operational BOMARC complex on 1 December 1959 (four missiles were ready by 1 January). It was part of the New York Air Defense Sector. The annex included a launch area with 56 Mode II Launcher Shelters in two flights—that meant that two compressor buildings were available to simultaneously ready two missiles to the "Standby" stage prior to "Fire-up".

The squadron stood alert from 1960 to 1964, equipped with IM-99 (later CIM-10) BOMARC surface to air antiaircraft missiles.  The squadron was tied into a Semi-Automatic Ground Environment (SAGE) direction center which could use analog computers to process information from ground radars, picket ships and airborne aircraft to accelerate the display of tracking data at the direction center to quickly direct the missile site to engage hostile aircraft.

Although geographically separated from the base, the annex was an off base facility of Suffolk County Air Force Base and the squadron command, administrative and logistic elements were on the base. The squadron was inactivated on 15 December 1964.

In 1985, the squadron was consolidated "on paper" with the 6th Antisubmarine Squadron and the 6th Combat Cargo Squadron, but has never been active with this designation.

Lineage
 6th Antisubmarine Squadron
 Constituted as the 3d Reconnaissance Squadron (Medium) on 20 November 1940
 Activated on 15 January 1941
 Redesignated 393d Bombardment Squadron (Medium) on 22 April 1942
 Redesignated 6th Antisubmarine Squadron (Heavy) on 29 November 1942
 Disbanded on 11 November 1943
 Reconstituted on 19 September 1985 and consolidated with the 6th Combat Cargo Squadron and the 6th Air Defense Missile Squadron as the 6th Tactical Missile Squadron

 6th Combat Cargo Squadron
 Constituted as the 6th Combat Cargo Squadron on 25 April 1944
 Activated on 1 May 1944
 Inactivated on 15 January 1946
 Disbanded on 8 October 1948
 Reconstituted on 19 September 1985 and consolidated with the 6th Antisubmarine Squadron and the 6th Air Defense Missile Squadron as the 6th Tactical Missile Squadron

 6th Air Defense Missile Squadron
 Constituted as the 6th Air Defense Missile Squadron on 12 January 1959
 Activated on 1 February 1959
 Inactivated on 15 February 1964
 Consolidated with the 6th Combat Cargo Squadron and the 6th Antisubmarine Squadron as the 6th Tactical Missile Squadron

Assignments
 2d Bombardment Wing, 15 January 1941 (attached to the 13th Bombardment Group)
 III Bomber Command, 5 June 1941 (remained attached to the 13th Bombardment Group)
 13th Bombardment Group, 25 February 1942
 25th Antisubmarine Wing, 30 November 1942
 Army Air Forces Antisubmarine Command, 8 June 1943
 479th Antisubmarine Group, 14 August – 11 November 1943
 2d Combat Cargo Group, 1 May 1944 – 15 January 1946
 New York Air Defense Sector, 1 February 1959 – 15 December 1964

Stations
 Langley Field, Virginia, 15 January 1941
 Orlando Army Air Base, Florida, 7 June 1941
 Mitchel Field, New York, 22 January 1942
 Westover Field, Massachusetts, 3 August 1942 – 1 April 1943
 Gander Airport, Newfoundland, c. 12 April 1943
 RAF Dunkeswell, England, 21 August 1943 (air echelon only after September)
 Salt Lake City Army Air Base, Utah, September – 30 October 1943 (ground echelon)
 RAF Podington, England, November – 11 November 1943 (air echelon)
 Syracuse Army Air Base, New York, 1 May 1944
 Baer Field, Indiana, 8 October 1944 – 27 October 1944
 Biak Island, Papua New Guinea, November 1944 (operated from Samar), 8 March 1945 – c. 25 March 1945
 Dulag, Leyte, Philippines, 26 March 1945
 Bolo Airfield, Okinawa, Ryuku Islands, Japan, 16 August 1945
 Yokota Airfield, Japan, September 1945 – 15 January 1946
 Suffolk County Air Force Base, New York, 1 February 1959 – 15 December 1964

Awards and campaigns

Aircraft and missiles
 Douglas B-18 Bolo, 1941–1943
 North American B-25 Mitchell, 1941–1943
 Lockheed A-29 Hudson, 1942
 Consolidated B-24 Liberator, 1943
 Douglas C-47 Skytrain, 1944, 1945
 Curtiss C-46 Commando, 1944–1945
 Boeing IM-99 (later CIM-10) BOMARC, 1959–1964

See also

 List of United States Air Force missile squadrons

References

Notes
 Explanatory notes

 Citations

Bibliography

 
 
 
 
 
 

006
Air defense squadrons of the United States Air Force
Military units and formations established in 1959
Military units and formations disestablished in 1964